Aly & Fila are an Egyptian trance music duo made up of Aly El Sayed Amr Fathalah (Aly) and Fadi Wassef Naguib (Fila). They host an Internet radio show called Future Sound of Egypt, and are the founders of the label of the same name. The duo has played events across the world including Ultra Music Festival, Tomorrowland, Global Gathering, and Luminosity Beach Festival. Four of their tracks were chosen as "Tune of the Year" on Armin Van Buuren's show A State of Trance: "We Control The Sunlight," which featured the vocals of Jwaydan Moyine in 2011, "Unbreakable," with Roger Shah and vocals by Susana in 2016, "Somebody Loves You", which featured vocals from Plumb in 2020,  and "For All Time" with Armin Van Buuren and vocals by Kazi Jay in 2021.

While both continue to produce music together, only Fadi currently goes on tour since Aly suffered a severe ear injury while performing and was advised to avoid loud music or risk losing the hearing in that ear altogether. Since then, Fadi has played on events and festivals like Cream at Amnesia in Ibiza, Electric Daisy Carnival, Creamfields, Ministry of Sound and Stereosonic.

History

Aly El Sayed Amr Fathalah (Aly) and Fadi Wassef Naguib (Fila), the Egyptian duo, were both born in 1981 and have known each other since kindergarten. They began making music and DJ-ing around the age of eighteen. After falling in love with the music of Paul Van Dyk, The Thrillseekers and Chicane, they built their first small studio and started doing electronic music and DJ-ing from 1999. Once they established themselves in Egypt, they decided to go international, signing with the German record label Euphonic Records in 2003. They were the first duo from Egypt that went international. Their first release, "Eye of Horus," was played by Paul Van Dyk, Armin Van Buuren, DJ Tiësto and others. The track was licensed to Fundamental Recordings in the Netherlands and reached number 4 position in the Dutch Dance charts.

After finishing their contract with Euphonic Records, Fila met with Andy Prinz, and they decided to launch their first sublabel of Offshore. Their first release through Offshore Music Switzerland / AP Pro Audio "Spirit of Ka" made it on numerous playlists.

They have played alongside Armin Van Buuren in his A State of Trance radio show celebrations all over the world including locations like Den Bosch, Miami, Sydney, Buenos Aires, Utrecht, and many others. The duo opened a new record label by the year 2009, naming it like the radio show, Future Sound of Egypt Recordings. The record label signed on DJs such as Sean Tyas, Arctic Moon, M.I.K.E. Push, Roger Shah, The Thrillseekers, Bjorn Akesson and Neptune Project. They have also signed other upcoming Egyptian trance DJs such as Philippe el Sisi, Mohamed Ragab, and Brave and in late 2010 the label joined forces with the Armada roster.

On their debut album, ‘Rising Sun’, the duo joined forces with vocalists and producers Tiff Lacey, Sue McLaren, Josie, Denise Rivera, Philippe El Sisi, Bjorn Akesson and many more. The characteristic sound of Aly & Fila is uplifting and euphoric trance, the main genre of their first album.

Aly & Fila celebrated the 200th episode of their radio show Future Sound Of Egypt 200 by throwing an event in their native home of Egypt on December 2, 2011. Set to light up the chosen venue of Echo Temple in Sharm El Sheikh, the line-up included John O’Callaghan, Roger Shah, Sied Van Riel and many others.

Following the FSOE 200 celebrations, Aly & Fila released their second studio album entitled Quiet Storm. This album followed their debut artist album, Rising Sun which was released in 2010. Quiet Storm featured collaborations with Solarstone, Arctic Moon, John O'Callaghan, Giuseppe Ottaviani, and many more. From that point on, Aly & Fila have released another album, The Other Shore, which features collaborations with Ferry Tayle, Stoneface & Terminal, Roger Shah, Roxanne Emery, and others. The album was released on October 3, 2014. In 2015, the duo released an album called The Chill Out which consists of remixes of tracks like "We Control the Sunlight" and "Mysteries Unfold". Most recently, Aly & Fila announced their plans for their next milestone, celebrating 450 episodes on their radio show, Future Sound of Egypt. They have confirmed stops at the Hollywood Palladium in Los Angeles, California on July 3, 2016, at the Victoria Warehouse in Manchester, United Kingdom on October 1, 2016, a Weekender on October 6 and 7 at Karnak Temple Complex in Luxor and as last station on October 29 in Kaohsiung in Taiwan.

The Future Sound of Egypt internet radio show airs every Wednesday at 4PM US Eastern / 9PM UK / 22:00 Central European Time on Digitally Imported radio.

Discography

Studio albums

Remix albums

Compilations

Singles

Remixes

References

External links

 Aly & Fila official website
 FSOE Recordings at Armada
 
 

Armada Music artists
Egyptian musical groups
Remixers
Egyptian trance musicians
Electronic dance music duos